Cajon Valley Union School District (CVUSD) is a school district in California. Its headquarters are in El Cajon.

The district has  of area and serves most of El Cajon. It also serves Rancho San Diego. The district has about 16,000 students in grades Kindergarten through 8.

It was established on October 4, 1870, as the El Cajon School District.

Schools
Middle schools
Cajon Valley Middle School
Greenfield Middle School
Hillsdale Middle School
Los Coches Creek Middle School
Montgomery Middle School
Emerald Middle School

Elementary schools
Anza Elementary School
Avocado Elementary School
Blossom Valley Elementary School
Bostonia Language Academy
Chase Elementary School
Crest Elementary School
Emerald STEAM Magnet Middle School
Fuerte Elementary School
W. D. Hall Elementary School
Jamacha Elementary School
Johnson Elementary School
Lexington Elementary School
Madison Elementary School
Magnolia Elementary School
Meridian Elementary School
Naranca Elementary School
Rancho San Diego Elementary School
Rios Computer Science Magnet Elementary School
Vista Grande Elementary School

Other schools
Empower Academy
Cajon Valley Home School
Sevick School
Flying Hills School of the Arts

References

External links

 Cajon Valley Union School District

School districts in San Diego County, California
1870 establishments in California
School districts established in 1870